The 2015–16 Russian Bandy Super League is the 24rd season of the present highest Russian men's bandy top division, Russian Bandy Super League. The regular season began on 8 November 2015, and the final was played on 26 March 2016, when Yenisey beat Baykal-Energiya, thus becoming champions for the third season in a row.

Teams

League table

Knock-out stage

References

Bandy
Bandy
Russian Bandy Super League
Russian Bandy Super League
Seasons in Russian bandy